Chromatium okenii is a Gram-negative bacterium found in water. It belongs to the Purple sulfur bacteria. These bacteria are capable of photosynthesis and use Hydrogen sulfide (H2S) as an electron donor for CO2 reduction and so do not produce oxygen. This type of photosynthesis is called anoxygenic photosynthesis.
Chromatium okenii is anaerobic and the cells are slightly curved or straight rods.

References

External links
 Chromatium J.P. Euzéby: List of Prokaryotic names with Standing in Nomenclature

Chromatiales
Bacteria described in 1838